Inzelga (İgenyılğa) is a rural locality (a selo) and the administrative centre of Belsky Selsoviet, Gafuriysky District, Bashkortostan, Russia. The population was 389 as of 2010. There are 3 streets.

Geography 
Inzelga is located 18 km west of Krasnousolsky (the district's administrative centre) by road. Tsapalovka is the nearest rural locality.

References 

Rural localities in Gafuriysky District